The 1992–93 Georgia Tech Yellow Jackets men's basketball team represented the Georgia Institute of Technology as a member of the Atlantic Coast Conference during the 1992–93 NCAA men's basketball season. Led by 12th year head coach Bobby Cremins, the Yellow Jackets reached the NCAA tournament where they were upset in the opening round by No. 13 seed .

Roster

Schedule

|-
!colspan=9 style=| Non-conference regular season

|-
!colspan=9 style=| ACC Regular Season

|-
!colspan=9 style=| ACC tournament

|-
!colspan=9 style=| NCAA tournament

Rankings

Players in the 1993 NBA draft

References

Georgia Tech Yellow Jackets men's basketball seasons
Georgia Tech
Georgia Tech